Anton Nuhn (June 21, 1814, Schriesheim, Baden – June 27, 1889) was a German anatomist.

He studied medicine at the University of Heidelberg, where he was a student of Friedrich Tiedemann (1781–1861). In 1842 he was a lecturer at Heidelberg, and shortly afterwards worked as prosector. In 1849 he became an associate professor at the institute of anatomy in Heidelberg, and in 1872 received the title of honorary professor.

"Nuhn's glands", also known as anterior lingual glands, are named after him. They are described as small, deeply placed seromucous glands located near the tip of the tongue on each side of the frenulum.

His most popular written work was an 1878 textbook on comparative anatomy titled Lehrbuch der vergleichenden Anatomie.

References 
 Antiquariat für Medizin (biographical information, translated from German)
 Mondofacto Dictionary (definition of eponym)

1814 births
1889 deaths
People from Rhein-Neckar-Kreis
People from the Grand Duchy of Baden
German anatomists
Academic staff of Heidelberg University